Tito Munoz could refer to:

 Tito Muñoz (born 1983), an American classical music conductor
 Tito the Builder, a John McCain supporter in the 2008 US presidential election
 Tito Muñoz (writer), Spanish writer